Windsor is a suburb of New Zealand's southernmost city, Invercargill.

Demographics

Windsor had a population of 3,090 at the 2018 New Zealand census, an increase of 141 people (4.8%) since the 2013 census, and an increase of 57 people (1.9%) since the 2006 census. There were 1,470 households. There were 1,383 males and 1,704 females, giving a sex ratio of 0.81 males per female. The median age was 45.3 years (compared with 37.4 years nationally), with 531 people (17.2%) aged under 15 years, 465 (15.0%) aged 15 to 29, 1,311 (42.4%) aged 30 to 64, and 780 (25.2%) aged 65 or older.

Ethnicities were 87.9% European/Pākehā, 11.2% Māori, 3.2% Pacific peoples, 5.6% Asian, and 2.1% other ethnicities (totals add to more than 100% since people could identify with multiple ethnicities).

The proportion of people born overseas was 12.8%, compared with 27.1% nationally.

Although some people objected to giving their religion, 41.6% had no religion, 48.5% were Christian, 0.5% were Hindu, 0.2% were Muslim, 0.7% were Buddhist and 1.8% had other religions.

Of those at least 15 years old, 492 (19.2%) people had a bachelor or higher degree, and 573 (22.4%) people had no formal qualifications. The median income was $32,100, compared with $31,800 nationally. 429 people (16.8%) earned over $70,000 compared to 17.2% nationally. The employment status of those at least 15 was that 1,233 (48.2%) people were employed full-time, 354 (13.8%) were part-time, and 75 (2.9%) were unemployed.

Education
Windsor North School is a state primary school for years 1 to 6 with a roll of  students as of  It was originally called Invercargill North School, and celebrated its centenary in 1977.

St Theresa's School is a state-integrated Catholic school for years 1 to 6 with a roll of  students. It opened in 1931.

References

Suburbs of Invercargill